Nick Arrojo (born 7 January 1966) is a celebrity hair stylist based in the SoHo neighborhood of New York City.

Born in Manchester, England, Arrojo worked as a stylist for Vidal Sassoon, Wella International, and Bumble & Bumble salons before starting his own studio in downtown Manhattan in September 2001, the Arrojo Studio, which encompasses Arrojo Education and Arrojo Product. He was the hairstylist on TLC's What Not to Wear for seven years. He recently released his own product line, Arrojo, and is currently working on several how-to books. He is also involved with Wella's "Trend Vision 2006" project.

Some of Arrojo's celebrity clients include supermodels Melissa Keller, Yamila Diaz, and Karen Ferrari; actors Minnie Driver and Liev Schreiber; musicians Bryan Adams and Bernard Sumner; and British comedian and performer Victoria Wood.

Arrojo taught the art of hair coloring to Queer Eye'''s Kyan Douglas. Arrojo was the resident stylist on TLC's What Not to Wear'' ; he left in 2009 during the show's seventh season and was replaced by Ted Gibson.

He is married to wife Lina Arrojo, who works at Arrojo Studios, and who gave birth to twin boys named Nico and Marco in February 2010.

References

External links 
 Arrojo Studio
 Arrojo Product
 Arrojo Education
 Arrojo Cosmetology

1966 births
Living people
British hairdressers
English expatriates in the United States
People from SoHo, Manhattan